Madduma Bandara Ehelapola (b 1806), mostly known as Madduma Bandara, was one of the national heroes of Sri Lanka. Bandara and his family were executed in 1814 by the King for treachery. His bravery at the time of his execution made him a legendary child hero in Sri Lanka.

Early life
Bandara was born in a prominent Sinhalese aristocratic family of the  Kandy to Ehelepola Maha Disawe and Ehelepola Kumarihamy. He was the second son of Ehelepola Maha Disawe, the Dissava of Sabaragamuwa under the King Sri Vikrama Rajasinha of Kandy Sri Lanka. He had an Elder brother (Loku Bandara) and two sisters (Tikiri Menike and Dingiri Menike). His uncle was Keppetipola Disawe, one of the prominent Kandyan leaders who signed the Kandyan Convention at the Audience Hall in Kandy on the 2nd of March 1815.

Execution
King Sri Wickremarajasinha thought that Ehelapola, as the Disawe of Sabaragamuwa, was aiding the rebellion against British rule, due to false information given to the king. Ehelapola was strongly fighting against the British, but the King was furious thinking that Ehelapola had switched sides. So while Ehelapola was away from Kandy, the King ordered the arrest of the Ehelapola Family. However, the king could not arrest Ehelapola, as he was in British custody in Colombo. Instead, the king arrested Ehelapola’s wife and children. On 17 May 1814, his sons were beheaded. Ehelapola’s wife, kumarihami, and daughters were forcibly drowned in Bogambara Lake by tying stones around their necks. While Bandara's brother was frightened to face death, he stepped forward and asked the executioner to behead him with a single strike.

See also

 Kingdom of Kandy

References

External links
 'Life of Ehelepola' - T. B. Pohat Kehelpannala

1806 births
1814 deaths
People of the Kingdom of Kandy
People from Kandy
Executed Sri Lankan people
Executed children
People executed by decapitation